Ladislav Škorpil (born 6 June 1945, in Hradec Králové) is a former Czech football player and former manager of the Czech club FC Slovan Liberec. Škorpil is also a member of the Civic Democratic Party in his hometown of Hradec Králové.

Coaching career
Ladislav Škorpil ended his playing career early and, at the age of 23, began the 1969/70 season as a C- and D-youth coach at Spartak Hradec Králové. During the 1970s, he worked for the A and B youth teams. In 1981, he won the Czechoslovak youth cup.

From 1982 to 1990, Škorpil worked as a youth coach in the Czechoslovak national team. In 1986, he won a youth championship with Spartak Hradec Králové. In the final of the championship the team beat the Slovak team, Tatran Prešov.

Although he once said "I never want to work with adults", he took over the first team of Hradec Králové as a head coach in 1990/1991 season. In 1993, he went to Slovakia to work in a small club, DAC Dunajska Streda. During 1994–95, he again trained the youngsters of the SK Hradec Králové; between 1995 and 1997 he worked at FK Dukla Prague. In the autumn of 1997, Škorpil returned to DAC Dunajska Streda for one season. During the 1998/99 season, he again coached SK Hradec Králové until the ninth match-day.

During the season, he was contacted by FC Slovan Liberec, where, as a head coach, he unexpectedly won the Czech Cup in 2000, and two years later celebrated the first league title in Liberec. In January 2004, he agreed the termination of his contract with Slovan and took over the Czech U-21 team. In October 2007, he returned to his former club Slovan Liberec as a successor of sacked coach, Michal Zach.

Coaching achievements
 Czech Cup winner 2000 (FC Slovan Liberec)
 Czech First League champion 2001/2002 (FC Slovan Liberec)

References

1945 births
Sportspeople from Hradec Králové
Living people
Czech footballers
Czechoslovak footballers
Czech football managers
Czechoslovak football managers
Czech First League managers
Slovak Super Liga managers
FC Hradec Králové managers
FC DAC 1904 Dunajská Streda managers
FK Dukla Prague managers
FC Slovan Liberec managers
Expatriate football managers in Slovakia
Czech expatriate sportspeople in Slovakia
Association footballers not categorized by position